Dušan Čaplovič (born 18 September 1946) is a Slovak politician, formerly a historian and archaeologist. In 2006–2010, he was the Deputy Prime Minister for Knowledge Society, European Affairs, Human Rights and Minorities. Čaplovič is also vice-chairman of Direction – Social Democracy.

He is a member of editorial boards of several national and international historical and archaeological journals.

Dušan Čaplovič joined the Communist Party in 1970. Since 2001, he is the vice-president of Direction – Social Democracy that the first operated under the name SMER - Social Democracy in January 2005. Additionally he is member of the presidency of Direction – Social Democracy. He was shadow minister for Education, Science and Culture in 2002. In 2002 he was elected to the National Council. He was a member of the Parliamentary Committee on Conflicts of Interest and the Committee on Education, Science, Sports and Youth, Culture and Media.

Čaplovič has been the Deputy Prime Minister for Knowledge, Society, European Affairs, Human Rights and Minorities since 2006. He pledged for a coalition with the SNS and the HZDS. After the demission of Environment Minister Jan Chrbet (SNS), prime minister Robert Fico refused the SNS-nomminee Karol Gordik and Dušan Čaplovič became interim Environment Minister. October 28, 2009 president Ivan Gašparovič appointed Jozef Medveď as the new Environment Minister.

Works
 Osídlenie Ostrej skaly nad Vyšným Kubínom, in: AVANS v r. 1977, Nitra 1978.
 Orava v praveku, vo včasnej dobe dejinnej a na začiatku stredoveku, Martin 1987.
 The Situation of Archaeological Research of Middle Ages. Agricultural Settlements in the Territory of Slovakia, in: Ruralia I, 1996.
 Etnické zmeny a vývoj stredovekého osídlenia v juhovýchodných oblastiach karpatského oblúku (9.-12. storočie), in: Początki sąsiedztwa. Pogranicze etniczne polsko-rusko-słowackie w średniowieczu. Rzeszów 1996.
 Oblasti východných Karpát a horného Potisia za panovania Svätopluka I. In: Svätopluk I. 894–1994. Nitra 1997.
 Včasnostredoveké osídlenie Slovenska, Bratislava 1998.
 Osmičky v našich dejinách (Perfekt Brat. 1999).
 Dokumenty slovenskej národnej identity a štátnosti I.,II. (Národné literárne centrum Brat. 1998).
 Dejiny Slovenska. With: Viliam Čičaj, Ľubomír Lipták, Ján Lukačka.

References

External links
 Website of Čaplovič in the National Council

1946 births
Living people
Politicians from Bratislava
Slovak communists
Direction – Social Democracy politicians
Members of the National Council (Slovakia) 2002-2006
Members of the National Council (Slovakia) 2010-2012
Members of the National Council (Slovakia) 2016-2020
Writers from Bratislava
Slovak archaeologists
Education ministers of Slovakia
Members of the National Council (Slovakia) 2012-2016
Comenius University alumni